CISR is the Center for Insurance Studies and Research in India.

CISR may also refer to:
Centre for Independent Social Research, nongovernmental research institute in St Petersburg, Russia
Center for International Stabilization and Recovery, formerly Mine Action Information Centre
Center for Invasive Species Research, at the University of California, Riverside